(from Latin: "Just as Long Ago") was a papal bull promulgated by Pope Eugene IV in Florence on January 13, 1435, which forbade the enslavement of the natives of the Canary Islands who had converted, or were converting to, Christianity.  was meant to reinforce , issued the previous year, condemning Portuguese slave raids in the Canary Islands.

Background 

Christianity had gained many converts in the Canary Islands by the early 1430s. The ownership of the lands had been the subject of dispute between Portugal and the Kingdom of Castille. The lack of effective control had resulted in periodic raids on the islands to procure slaves. Acting on a complaint by Fernando Calvetos, bishop of the islands, Pope Eugene IV issued a papal bull, Creator omnium, on 17 December 1434, annulling previous permission granted to Portugal to conquer those islands still pagan. Eugene excommunicated anyone who enslaved newly converted Christians, the penalty to stand until the captives were restored to their liberty and possessions.

Sicut dudum 
Slave raids continued in the islands during 1435 and Eugene issued a further edict (Sicut dudum) that affirmed the ban on enslavement, and ordered, under pain of excommunication, that all such slaves be immediately set free:

Eugene went on to say that, "If this is not done when the fifteen days have passed, they incur the sentence of excommunication by the act itself, from which they cannot be absolved, except at the point of death, even by the Holy See, or by any Spanish bishop, or by the aforementioned Ferdinand, unless they have first given freedom to these captive persons and restored their goods." The specific reference to Spanish bishops and Bishop Ferdinand of San Marcial del Rubicón in Lanzarote suggests that the Portuguese were not the only ones engaged in slave raids in the Canaries.

Sicut dudum is viewed as a significant condemnation of slavery, issued sixty years before the Europeans found the New World.

Eugene tempered Sicut dudum with another bull (15 September 1436) due to the complaints made by King Duarte of Portugal, that allowed the Portuguese to conquer any unconverted parts of the Canary Islands. The king suggested that Portugal be authorized to evangelize and civilize the islands, as other less reputable persons were unlikely to heed the pontiff. Political weakness compelled the Renaissance Papacy to adopt an acquiescent and unchallenging position when approached for requests for privileges in favour of these ventures. Without a navy of his own to police the islands, the Pope opted in favor of the Portuguese as the lesser of two evils.

In 1476 Pope Sixtus IV reiterated the concerns expressed in Sicut dudum in his papal bull, Regimini gregis, in which he threatened to excommunicate all captains or pirates who enslaved Christians.

Notes

References 
 Housley, Norman. Religious Warfare in Europe 1400–1536, Oxford University Press, 2002 
 "The Historical Encyclopedia of World slavery", Contributor Richard Raiswell, Editor Junius P. Rodriguez, ABC-CLIO, 1997, 
 "Christopher Columbus and the enslavement of the Amerindians in the Caribbean. (Columbus and the New World Order 1492–1992).", Sued-Badillo, Jalil, Monthly Review. Monthly Review Foundation, Inc. 1992. HighBeam Research. 10 August 2009 
"Development or Reversal?", Cardinal Avery Cardinal Dulles, S.J., First Things magazine, October 2005 
 Panzer, Joel S., "The Popes and Slavery", Homiletic & Pastoral Review (December 1996)

External links
 Sicut dudum, English translation

Catholicism and slavery
15th-century Catholicism
Abolitionism in Africa
1435 works
History of the Canary Islands
Guanche
15th-century papal bulls
Documents of Pope Eugene IV